Acrocercops cymella is a moth of the family Gracillariidae known from Puerto Rico. It was described by William Trowbridge Merrifield Forbes in 1931.

References

cymella
Moths of the Caribbean
Moths described in 1931